Worthing Football Club are an English association football club based in Worthing, West Sussex, fielding men's and women's teams. From 2021—22 season the women's team will play in the London and South East Women's Regional Football League Premier Division. This followed Worthing having led Division One South of the London and South East Women's Regional Football League in both 2019—20 and 2020—21 until both seasons being curtailed due to the Covid-19 pandemic. The club plays at Woodside Road.

Former Brighton & Hove Albion Women and Lewes F.C. Women manager John Donoghue was appointed manager in April 2021.

Managerial history

See also
Sport in Worthing
Football in Sussex

References

External links
Official site

Women's football clubs in England
Sport in Worthing